Sunray (also Beckett) is a small unincorporated community in Stephens County, Oklahoma, United States, south of Duncan on U.S. Route 81. The community is adjacent to the old DX-Sunray refinery (TOSCO Corp. Duncan refinery) which closed in 1983. The refinery was imploded in 2006.

Demographics

Climate
Climate is characterized by relatively high temperatures and evenly distributed precipitation throughout the year.  The Köppen Climate Classification subtype for this climate is "Cfa" (Humid Subtropical Climate).

References

Unincorporated communities in Stephens County, Oklahoma
Unincorporated communities in Oklahoma